{{Automatic taxobox
|taxon = Spirocolpus
|image = 
|image_caption = 
|authority = Finlay, 1926 
|synonyms_ref = 
|synonyms = 
|type_species = † Turritella waihaoensis Marwick, 1924 
|subdivision_ranks = Species
|subdivision = See text
|display_parents = 3
}}Spirocolpus is a genus of sea snails, marine gastropod mollusks in the family Turritellidae.
 
Species
Species within the genus Spirocolpus include:
 † Spirocolpus carsoni Finlay & Marwick, 1937
 † Spirocolpus meadii (Baily, 1855) 
 † Spirocolpus rudis (P. Marshall, 1919)
 † Spirocolpus tophinus (Marwick, 1926)
 † Spirocolpus waihaoensis'' (Marwick, 1924)

References

External links
 Finlay H.J. (1926). A further commentary on New Zealand molluscan systematics. Transactions and Proceedings of the New Zealand Institute. 57: 320-485, pls 18-23

Turritellidae
Taxa named by Harold John Finlay